Lavangi Mirchi is an Indian Marathi language drama series which is airing on Zee Marathi. It starred Shivani Baokar and Tanmay Jakka in lead roles. It is produced under the banner of Ruchi Films. It premiered from 13 February 2023 on Zee Marathi. It is an official remake of Telugu series Radhamma Kuthuru.

Cast 
 Shivani Baokar as Asmita (Asmee)
 Tanmay Jakka as Nishant
 Shruja Prabhudesai as Radhakka
 Mithila Patil as Archana
 Prerna Khedekar as Manava (Munnu)
 Dnyanesh Wadekar as Gopinath
 Pari Telang as Yamini
 Samidha Guru
 Krushna Rajshekhar
 Rajesh Uke

Adaptations

References

External links 
 Lavangi Mirchi at ZEE5

Marathi-language television shows
2023 Indian television series debuts
Zee Marathi original programming